The Rolls-Royce Trent 800 is a high-bypass turbofan produced by Rolls-Royce plc, one of the engine options for the early Boeing 777 variants.

Launched in September 1991, it first ran in September 1993, was granted EASA certification on 27 January 1995, and entered service in 1996.
It reached a 40% market share, ahead of the competing PW4000 and GE90, and the last Trent 800-powered 777 was delivered in 2010.

The Trent 800 has the Trent family three shaft architecture, with a  fan.
With a 6.4:1 bypass ratio and an overall pressure ratio reaching 40.7:1, it generates up to 413.4 kN (92,940 lbf) of thrust.

Development

By 1990, as Boeing was studying the enlarged 767-X, Rolls-Royce was proposing its Trent engine with a larger  fan driven by a new, bigger LP turbine, a modified IP compressor and no exhaust mixer.
After being rebuffed by British Airways, Rolls-Royce launched the Trent 800 in September 1991 with a £250 million ($432.5 million) order from Thai Airways to power 15 Boeing 777s, certification was then planned for 1995 and first deliveries for January 1996.

Certification was applied for on 2 April 1992.
By September 1992, its fan was to be tested in December and a full test was planned for September 1993.
Certification was granted by the EASA on 27 January 1995.
The first Boeing 777 with Trent 800 engines flew on 26 May 1995 and ETOPS approval was granted by the FAA on 10 October 1996.
The Trent 800 entered service on the Boeing 777 in 1996, with Thai Airways on 31 March. 

In 1995, the Trent 800 won a large order from Singapore Airlines, a traditional Pratt & Whitney customer.
In 1996, Rolls-Royce had a 32% market share, above GE but behind PW.
By June 1998, the 33 aircraft fleet had a Trent 800 dispatch reliability over 99.96%.
By July 1999, Rolls had won 45% of all engine orders for the 777.

The Trent 800 later reached a 40% share of the engine market on the 777 variants for which it is available. 
The Singapore order was followed by large orders from American Airlines and Delta Air Lines. British Airways announced in September 1998 that it was returning to Rolls-Royce for its second batch of 777s, and did so again in April 2007.
Other major operators include Air New Zealand and Kenya Airways.

The last Trent 800-powered 777 was delivered in 2010.
The later -300ER, -200LR, 777F, Boeing 777X-8 and -9 are powered exclusively by GE Aviation engines.

As of 2014 Rolls-Royce is offering an upgraded version of the engine, known as the Trent 800EP. It incorporates technology from Trent 1000 and Trent XWB engines including elliptical leading edges on intermediate- and high-pressure compressor blades. Rolls-Royce claims that it provides a 0.7% fuel-burn benefit.

Design

The Trent 800 is an axial flow, high bypass turbofan with three coaxial shafts.
The fan is driven by a 5-stage axial LP turbine (3300 rpm), the 8-stage IP compressor (7000 rpm) and the 6-stage HP compressor (10611 rpm) are each powered by a single stage turbine.
It has an annular combustor with 24 fuel nozzles and is controlled by an EEC.
The engine has a 6.4:1 bypass ratio in cruise and an overall pressure ratio of 33.9 to 40.7:1 at sea level, for a 340.6–413.4 kN (76,580–92,940 lbf) take-off thrust.
The  fan has 26 diffusion bonded, wide chord titanium fan blades.

Japanese KHI and Marubeni Corporation are risk and revenue sharing partners on the Trent 800.

Incidents
On 17 January 2008, a British Airways Boeing 777-236ER, operating as BA038 from Beijing to London, crash-landed at Heathrow after both Trent 800 engines lost power during the aircraft's final approach. The subsequent investigation found that ice released from the fuel system had accumulated on the fuel-oil heat exchanger, leading to a restriction of fuel flow to the engines. On 26 November 2008, Delta Air Lines Flight 18 from Shanghai to Atlanta, a Trent 895-powered Boeing 777, experienced an "uncommanded rollback" of one engine while in cruise at 39,000 feet (12,000 m). The National Transportation Safety Board (NTSB) concluded the cause of both incidents was the same - ice clogging the inlet side of the fuel-oil heat exchanger (FOHE) of the affected engines. These incidents, along with a similar incident in May of 2009 involving an Airbus A-330 with Rolls Royce Trent-700 engines, resulted in Airworthiness Directives mandating the replacement of the fuel-oil heat exchangers in similar Rolls Royce Trent series engines. Rolls-Royce developed a modification to prevent the problem recurring that involved replacing a face plate that had many small protruding tubes with one that is flat.

Engines on display

A Trent 800 is on display at the Rolls-Royce Heritage Trust Collection, Derby.

A Trent 800 is on display at the Imperial War Museum Duxford, in the first hall.

Variants

Specifications (Trent 800)

See also

References

Notes

External links

Trent 800
High-bypass turbofan engines
1990s turbofan engines